Paper Girls is an American science fiction drama television series created by Stephany Folsom. It is based on the 2015–2019 comic book series of the same name written by Brian K. Vaughan and illustrated by Cliff Chiang. The series premiered on Amazon Prime Video on July 29, 2022. In September 2022, the series was canceled after one season.

Premise
Paper Girls follows four young girls who, while out delivering papers during the dark morning hours after Halloween in 1988, become unwittingly caught in a conflict between warring factions of time-travelers, sending them on an adventure through time that will save the world. As they travel between time periods, they encounter future versions of themselves and must choose to embrace or reject their fate.

Cast and characters

Main
 Camryn Jones as Tiff Quilkin, an African-American girl with a high intellect
 Riley Lai Nelet as Erin Tieng, a Chinese-American girl on her first day delivering newspapers
 Sofia Rosinsky as Mac Coyle, a Caucasian tomboy who lives in the outskirts of Stony Stream
 Fina Strazza as KJ Brandman, a Jewish-American girl whose family owns several businesses in Stony Stream
 Adina Porter as Prioress, a high-ranking officer of the Old Watch

Recurring

 Ali Wong as adult Erin Tieng, a struggling paralegal in 2019
 Nate Corddry as Larry, a farmer and member of the STF Underground
 Sekai Abenì as adult Tiffany Quilkin, a lighting designer in 1999

Guest 

 Kai Young as Heck, a teenage STF Underground soldier who encounters the paper girls in 1988
 William Bennett as Naldo, Heck's comrade
 Celeste Arias as Juniper, a female STF Underground soldier
 Cliff Chamberlain as Dylan Coyle, Mac's elder brother who is a successful surgeon in 2019
 Jessika Van as Missy Tieng, Erin's younger sister who works as a pilot in 2019
 Jason Mantzoukas as Grand Father, leader of the Old Watch
 Delia Cunningham as adult KJ Brandman, who becomes a film school student in 1999
 Maren Lord as Lauren, adult KJ's classmate and lover

Production

Development
On July 11, 2019, it was announced that Amazon Studios had put the project in development with a series commitment, with Brian K. Vaughan, who wrote the original comic book series, executive producing the project under his overall deal with Legendary Entertainment. It was also announced that Stephany Folsom would write the series, as well as executive produce alongside Vaughan. On July 23, 2020, the project was officially greenlit to series, with Cliff Chiang, Christopher Cantwell, and Christopher C. Rogers joining as executive producers. On July 31, 2021, it was reported that Folsom has exited the series. On September 9, 2022, Amazon Prime Video canceled the series after one season, with Legendary Television shopping it around to other networks.

Casting
On April 26, 2021, it was announced that Sofia Rosinsky, Camryn Jones, Riley Lai Nelet, and Fina Strazza were cast in the four lead roles. On May 6, 2021, Ali Wong joined the main cast. On June 15, 2021, Nate Corddry was cast in a starring role.

Filming
The series was initially set to begin filming on March 1, 2021, but was later pushed back to May 17, 2021, in Chicago, Illinois. On May 28, 2021, photography took place in and around the Joliet police station. The series concluded filming on October 1, 2021.

Episodes

Release
The series was released on Amazon Prime Video on July 29, 2022.

Reception
The review aggregator website Rotten Tomatoes reported an 91% approval rating with an average rating of 7/10, based on 64 critic reviews. The website's critics consensus reads, "Folding together time-traveling wonder with a strong ensemble of youngsters who are as dimensional as origami, Paper Girls is an absolute blast to the future." Metacritic, which uses a weighted average, assigned a score of 70 out of 100 based on 20 critics, indicating "generally favorable reviews".

References

External links
 
 

2020s American drama television series
2020s American LGBT-related drama television series
2020s American science fiction television series
2020s American time travel television series
2022 American television series debuts
2022 American television series endings
Amazon Prime Video original programming
English-language television shows
Lesbian-related television shows
Television series about cancer
Television series based on Image Comics
Television series by Amazon Studios
Television series by Legendary Television
Television series set in 1988
Television series set in 1999
Television series set in 2019
Television shows filmed in Illinois
Television shows set in Cleveland